Czołowo may refer to the following places:
Czołowo, Koło County in Greater Poland Voivodeship (west-central Poland)
Czołowo, Poznań County in Greater Poland Voivodeship (west-central Poland)
Czołowo, Kuyavian-Pomeranian Voivodeship (north-central Poland)